Tiabet may refer to:

 Glibenclamide 
Tiabet, New Caledonia